Sergei Yevgenyevich Aleinikov (Syarhey Alyeynikaw; born 7 November 1961) is a Belarusian and Soviet former professional footballer, and currently a coach. He primarily played as a defensive midfielder and was known for his stamina, intelligence, solid technique, tactical sense, and passing ability. He also played in defence as a sweeper or centre-back.

Playing career
Aleinikov was born in Minsk, Belarusian SSR. He played for the USSR national football team, making 73 appearances, scoring six goals, from 1984 to 1991, and was in the Soviet squad that made the final of Euro 1988, losing to the Netherlands 0–2. He also played for the CIS in 1992 and earned 4 caps for Belarus after the independence of Belarus, earning his final cap against Luxembourg in a Euro 1996 qualifier in 1994.

He joined Dinamo Minsk in 1981 and won the USSR championship the following season. The midfielder then joined Juventus F.C. in 1989, and won the UEFA Cup and Coppa Italia in 1990. He signed for U.S. Lecce in 1990, and in 1992 went to Japan to play for Gamba Osaka. He finished his career with Swedish side IK Oddevold in 1996.

In November 2003, to celebrate UEFA's Jubilee, he was selected as the Golden Player of Belarus by the Football Federation of Belarus as their most outstanding player of the past 50 years.

Coaching career
In the 2007–08 season Aleinikov served as head coach of amateur Promozione team Kras. He coached the side for a second time from summer 2011 until 30 October 2012.

Personal life
His son Artur (born 1991), a midfielder, followed his father's footsteps and was part of Novara squad in 2009.

Career statistics

Club

International

Honours
Dinamo Minsk
Soviet Top League: 1982

Juventus
Coppa Italia: 1989–90
UEFA Cup: 1989–90

Soviet Union
UEFA European Championship runner-up: 1988

References

External links
 UEFA.com - Golden player of Belarus
 Aleinikov at Juve and Lecce

1961 births
Living people
Footballers from Minsk
Soviet footballers
Belarusian footballers
Association football midfielders
UEFA Golden Players
UEFA Cup winning players
Soviet Union international footballers
1986 FIFA World Cup players
UEFA Euro 1988 players
1990 FIFA World Cup players
UEFA Euro 1992 players
Belarus international footballers
Dual internationalists (football)
Soviet expatriate footballers
Belarusian expatriate footballers
Expatriate footballers in Italy
Expatriate footballers in Japan
Expatriate footballers in Sweden
Belarusian expatriate sportspeople in Italy
Belarusian expatriate sportspeople in Sweden
Belarusian expatriate sportspeople in Japan
Soviet expatriate sportspeople in Italy
Soviet Top League players
Serie A players
Serie B players
J1 League players
Allsvenskan players
FC Dinamo Minsk players
Juventus F.C. players
U.S. Lecce players
Gamba Osaka players
IK Oddevold players
Belarusian football managers
Belarusian expatriate football managers
Expatriate football managers in Italy
Expatriate football managers in Russia
Expatriate football managers in Lithuania
Russian Premier League managers
FC Moscow managers
Honoured Masters of Sport of the USSR